Michael Pärt (sometimes spelled Michael Paert, born 17 August 1977) is an Estonian music producer and music editor. 

Since 2010 he is chairman of the board of the Arvo Pärt Centre. He also owns a music editing company Michael Pärt Musik.

Biography
Michael Pärt was born as a younger son of classical composer Arvo Pärt and his wife Nora. In 1980 the family left the Soviet Union for political reasons. Michael Pärt spent his childhood and youth in Austria, Germany, and the United Kingdom before returning to Estonia in 2008.

He holds a Master's degree in Music for Composing for Film and TV with distinction from Kingston University in London.

Film music
He has worked together with several notable people of music and film, including Icelandic singer Björk, composers Danny Elfman, Alexandre Desplat, and Howard Shore, and film directors Peter Jackson, Francis Ford Coppola, and Tom Hooper.

His most recent film projects as music editor were Tom Hooper's The Danish Girl (2015) and Justin Chadwick's Tulip Fever (2017).

Additionally, he contributed to award-winning projects such as the BAFTA-winning LazyTown and the Grammy-nominated albums Volta and Vulnicura by Björk and Neon Bible by Arcade Fire.

Arvo Pärt Centre
In 2008 Michael Pärt returned to Estonia to establish the Arvo Pärt Centre which he chairs. The foundation preserves Arvo Pärt's creative contribution to the arts for future generations.

References

External links
 

1977 births
Living people
Musicians from Tallinn
Estonian record producers
Waldorf school alumni
Alumni of Kingston University
Arvo Pärt
21st-century Estonian composers
21st-century Estonian musicians